Automated Decision Support, or ADS, systems are rule-based systems that are able to automatically provide solutions to repetitive management problems. ADSs are very closely related to business informatics and business analytics.

Automated decision support systems are based on business rules. These business rules can be created or operated by the business analytics. The business rules can trigger a decision that is part of the business informatics.

ADSs are most useful in situations that require solutions to repetitive problems mostly using electronically available information. The required knowledge and relevant decision criteria must be very clearly defined and structured. The problem situation at hand must be clear and well understood.

Components to ADSs are also provided by software development companies. The following components are provided:
 Rules engines
 Mathematical and statistical algorithms
 Industry-specific packages
 Enterprise systems
 Workflow applications

See also 
 Automated decision-making
 Decision support system
 Enterprise Decision Management

References

Further reading 
 DeSanctis, Gerardine; Gallupe, R. Brent "A Foundation for the Study of Group Decision Support Systems ," Gallupe Management Science, Vol. 33, No. 5. (May, 1987), pp. 589–609
Fjermestad, Jerry and Hiltz, Starr Roxanne. "An assessment of group support systems experimental research: methodology and results," Journal of Management Information Systems Volume 15, Issue 3 (December 1998), pp. 7 – 149
Jessup, Leonard M. and Tansik, David A.  "Decision Making in an Automated Environment: The Effects of Anonymity and Proximity with a Group Decision Support System," Decision Sciences 22 (2), 1991, pp. 266–279 
Nunamaker, J. F., Applegate, Lynda M. and Konsynski, Benn R. "Computer-Aided Deliberation: Model Management and Group Decision Support (in Special Focus on Decision Support Systems)," Operations Research, Vol. 36, No. 6. (Nov. - Dec., 1988), pp. 826–848.
O'Keefe, Robert M. and McEachern, Tim. "Web-based customer decision support systems," Communications of the ACM archive Volume 41, Issue 3 (March 1998), pp. 71 – 78
Turban, Leidner, McLean and Wetherbe, Information Technology for Management, Wiley & Sons, Inc. 2007, 

Decision support systems